There are several 2015 UCI World Championships. The International Cycling Union (UCI) holds World Championships every year. For 2015, these include:

 2015 UCI Road World Championships in Richmond, Virginia in September 2015.
 2015 UCI Track Cycling World Championships in February 2015
 2015 UCI Para-cycling Road World Championships
 2015 UCI Para-cycling Track World Championships
 2015 UCI Mountain Bike & Trials World Championships
 2015 UCI Mountain Bike Marathon World Championships
 2015 UCI Cyclo-cross World Championships
 2015 UCI BMX World Championships
 2015 UCI Indoor Cycling World Championships

UCI World Championships
UCI World Championships